Malfeasance in office is often grounds for a just cause removal of an elected official by statute or recall election. Malfeasance in office contrasts with "misfeasance in office", which is the commission of a lawful act, done in an official capacity, that improperly causes harm; and "nonfeasance in office," which is the failure to perform an official duty.

An exact definition of malfeasance in office is difficult: many highly regarded secondary sources (such as books and commentaries) compete over its established elements based on reported cases.  This confusion has arisen from the courts where no single consensus definition has arisen from the relatively few reported appeal-level cases involving malfeasance in office.

England and Wales
Under English law, misconduct in public office is a criminal offence at common law that dates back to the 13th century.

The offence carries a maximum penalty of life imprisonment. It is confined to those who are public office holders, and is committed when the office holder acts (or neglects to act) in a way that constitutes a breach of the duties of that office. Case law has established a broad definition of "public office holder" for this purpose that does not depend on the person holding a formal "office" as such, nor on being paid out of the public purse, though a government employee is more likely to be found to fall into the definition.

The Crown Prosecution Service guidelines on this offence say that the elements of the offence are when:
 a public officer acting as such
 wilfully neglects to perform their duty and/or wilfully misconducts themself
 to such a degree as to amount to an abuse of the public's trust in the office holder
 without reasonable excuse or justification.

The similarly-named misfeasance in public office is a tort. In the House of Lords judgement on the BCCI case, it was held that this had three essential elements:
 The defendant must be a public officer;
 The defendant must have been exercising his power as a public officer;
 The defendant is either exercising targeted malice or exceeding his powers.

United States
The West Virginia Supreme Court of Appeals summarized a number of the definitions of malfeasance in office applied by various appellate courts in the United States.

The court then went on to use yet another definition, "malfeasance is the doing of an act which an officer had no legal right to do at all and that when an officer, through ignorance, inattention, or malice, does that which they have no legal right to do at all, or acts without any authority whatsoever, or exceeds, ignores, or abuses their powers, they are guilty of malfeasance."

Nevertheless, a few "elements" can be distilled from those cases. First, malfeasance in office requires an affirmative act or omission. Second, the act must have been done in an official capacity—under the color of office. Finally, that that act somehow interferes with the performance of official duties—though some debate remains about "whose official" duties.

In addition, jurisdictions differ greatly over whether intent or knowledge is necessary.  As noted above, many courts will find malfeasance in office where there is "ignorance, inattention, or malice", which implies no intent or knowledge is required.

See also
 Abuse of power
 F. O. "Potch" Didier
 Graft
 Misfeasance

Notes and references

Misconduct
Public law
Crimes
Common law offences in England and Wales